Salah Mezhiev is the supreme mufti of Chechnya.

See also 
 2016 international conference on Sunni Islam in Grozny

References

Living people
Chechen people
Muftis
Year of birth missing (living people)